Stig Gunnar Olof Johansson (born 1938 in Mora, Sweden), professionally often abbreviated S. G. O. Johansson, is a Swedish immunologist. Their joint paper was published in April 1969.

Johansson received a PhD in 1968. Later in 1968, he finished his remaining courses in medical school and earned his medical degree. In 1969, he became a docent in immunology. In 1980, Johansson became a professor in clinical immunology at Karolinska Institute.

References

Swedish immunologists
Academic staff of Uppsala University
1938 births
Living people